Maria Abreu may refer to:
 Maria T. Abreu (born 1966), American gastroenterologist
 Maria João Abreu (1964–2021), Portuguese film, television and stage actress